Yao Léonard Djaha (born 4 November 2001) is an Ivorian professional footballer who plays as a midfielder for Maktaaral.

References

External links 
 
 

2001 births
Living people
Ivorian footballers
Ivorian expatriate footballers
Expatriate footballers in Moldova
Ivorian expatriate sportspeople in Moldova
Expatriate footballers in Belarus
Expatriate footballers in Kazakhstan
Ivorian expatriate sportspeople in Belarus
Association football midfielders
ASEC Mimosas players
FC Sucleia players
FC Smorgon players
FC Maktaaral players
Belarusian Premier League players